This is a partial list of unnumbered minor planets for principal provisional designations assigned between 1 January and 31 December 1996. , a total of 223 bodies remain unnumbered for this period. Also see previous and next year.

A 

|- id="1996 AP1" bgcolor=#FFC2E0
| 7 ||  || APO || 24.7 || data-sort-value="0.041" | 41 m || single || 10 days || 24 Jan 1996 || 13 || align=left | Disc.: Spacewatch || 
|- id="1996 AE2" bgcolor=#FFC2E0
| 1 ||  || APO || 20.3 || data-sort-value="0.31" | 310 m || multiple || 1996–2020 || 03 Feb 2020 || 329 || align=left | Disc.: SpacewatchAMO at MPC || 
|- id="1996 AY4" bgcolor=#d6d6d6
| 0 ||  || MBA-O || 17.05 || 2.2 km || multiple || 1996–2021 || 09 Jul 2021 || 42 || align=left | Disc.: Spacewatch || 
|- id="1996 AB6" bgcolor=#E9E9E9
| 0 ||  || MBA-M || 18.10 || 1.3 km || multiple || 1996–2021 || 06 Sep 2021 || 75 || align=left | Disc.: SpacewatchAlt.: 2010 CX66, 2010 JJ208, 2013 XR6 || 
|- id="1996 AW8" bgcolor=#E9E9E9
| 0 ||  || MBA-M || 17.7 || data-sort-value="0.86" | 860 m || multiple || 1996–2021 || 08 May 2021 || 43 || align=left | Disc.: SpacewatchAdded on 5 November 2021 || 
|- id="1996 AY9" bgcolor=#d6d6d6
| 0 ||  || MBA-O || 17.34 || 1.9 km || multiple || 1996–2020 || 29 Jun 2020 || 38 || align=left | Disc.: Spacewatch || 
|- id="1996 AK11" bgcolor=#E9E9E9
| 0 ||  || MBA-M || 17.02 || 2.2 km || multiple || 1996–2021 || 23 Oct 2021 || 172 || align=left | Disc.: Spacewatch || 
|- id="1996 AL11" bgcolor=#d6d6d6
| 0 ||  || MBA-O || 16.2 || 3.2 km || multiple || 1996–2020 || 19 Apr 2020 || 75 || align=left | Disc.: SpacewatchAlt.: 2014 FT13, 2016 PR53 || 
|- id="1996 AJ12" bgcolor=#d6d6d6
| 0 ||  || MBA-O || 16.53 || 2.8 km || multiple || 1996–2021 || 25 Nov 2021 || 176 || align=left | Disc.: Spacewatch || 
|- id="1996 AK17" bgcolor=#E9E9E9
| 0 ||  || MBA-M || 17.75 || 1.6 km || multiple || 1996–2021 || 07 Nov 2021 || 84 || align=left | Disc.: SpacewatchAlt.: 2010 AD110, 2010 NO133 || 
|- id="1996 AZ17" bgcolor=#fefefe
| 0 ||  || MBA-I || 18.4 || data-sort-value="0.62" | 620 m || multiple || 1996–2018 || 19 Apr 2018 || 117 || align=left | Disc.: SpacewatchAdded on 29 January 2022 || 
|- id="1996 AJ19" bgcolor=#E9E9E9
| 0 ||  || MBA-M || 16.73 || 2.5 km || multiple || 1996–2021 || 26 Nov 2021 || 147 || align=left | Disc.: Spacewatch || 
|- id="1996 AO19" bgcolor=#E9E9E9
| 0 ||  || MBA-M || 17.2 || 1.5 km || multiple || 1996–2020 || 20 Dec 2020 || 125 || align=left | Disc.: Spacewatch || 
|- id="1996 AR20" bgcolor=#C7FF8F
| 7 ||  || CEN || 14.0 || 9.0 km || single || 13 days || 25 Jan 1996 || 9 || align=left | Disc.: Spacewatch || 
|- id="1996 AS20" bgcolor=#C2E0FF
| – ||  || TNO || 9.3 || 77 km || single || 13 days || 27 Jan 1996 || 12 || align=left | Disc.: SpacewatchLoUTNOs, centaur || 
|- id="1996 AU20" bgcolor=#fefefe
| 0 ||  || MBA-I || 17.67 || data-sort-value="0.87" | 870 m || multiple || 1996–2022 || 27 Jan 2022 || 193 || align=left | Disc.: Spacewatch || 
|- id="1996 AV20" bgcolor=#E9E9E9
| 0 ||  || MBA-M || 17.19 || 1.5 km || multiple || 1996–2021 || 08 Nov 2021 || 142 || align=left | Disc.: Spacewatch || 
|}
back to top

B 

|- id="1996 BT" bgcolor=#FFC2E0
| 9 || 1996 BT || APO || 23.0 || data-sort-value="0.089" | 89 m || single || 10 days || 29 Jan 1996 || 20 || align=left | Disc.: Spacewatch || 
|- id="1996 BA1" bgcolor=#FFC2E0
| 1 ||  || AMO || 20.2 || data-sort-value="0.32" | 320 m || multiple || 1996–2020 || 12 Dec 2020 || 124 || align=left | Disc.: Spacewatch || 
|- id="1996 BG1" bgcolor=#FFC2E0
| 3 ||  || ATE || 23.8 || data-sort-value="0.062" | 62 m || multiple || 1996–2019 || 09 Feb 2019 || 36 || align=left | Disc.: Spacewatch || 
|- id="1996 BL5" bgcolor=#d6d6d6
| 0 ||  || MBA-O || 16.7 || 2.5 km || multiple || 1996–2020 || 26 Apr 2020 || 68 || align=left | Disc.: Spacewatch || 
|- id="1996 BP5" bgcolor=#E9E9E9
| 0 ||  || MBA-M || 16.67 || 2.6 km || multiple || 1996–2021 || 28 Oct 2021 || 114 || align=left | Disc.: Spacewatch || 
|- id="1996 BZ5" bgcolor=#E9E9E9
| 0 ||  || MBA-M || 17.0 || 1.7 km || multiple || 1996–2021 || 01 Dec 2021 || 108 || align=left | Disc.: Spacewatch || 
|- id="1996 BC6" bgcolor=#E9E9E9
| 0 ||  || MBA-M || 16.45 || 1.5 km || multiple || 1996–2021 || 11 May 2021 || 126 || align=left | Disc.: SpacewatchAlt.: 2003 YM150 || 
|- id="1996 BM11" bgcolor=#E9E9E9
| 1 ||  || MBA-M || 18.3 || data-sort-value="0.92" | 920 m || multiple || 1996–2013 || 08 Jan 2013 || 27 || align=left | Disc.: SpacewatchAlt.: 2009 CZ10 || 
|- id="1996 BD16" bgcolor=#fefefe
| 0 ||  || MBA-I || 18.5 || data-sort-value="0.59" | 590 m || multiple || 1996–2021 || 04 Jan 2021 || 62 || align=left | Disc.: Spacewatch || 
|- id="1996 BG16" bgcolor=#fefefe
| 0 ||  || MBA-I || 17.94 || data-sort-value="0.77" | 770 m || multiple || 1996–2021 || 31 Oct 2021 || 72 || align=left | Disc.: Spacewatch || 
|- id="1996 BW17" bgcolor=#E9E9E9
| 0 ||  || MBA-M || 16.54 || 2.1 km || multiple || 1996–2022 || 25 Jan 2022 || 186 || align=left | Disc.: LINEAR || 
|- id="1996 BZ18" bgcolor=#E9E9E9
| 0 ||  || MBA-M || 17.35 || 1.9 km || multiple || 1996–2021 || 01 Nov 2021 || 96 || align=left | Disc.: Spacewatch || 
|- id="1996 BA19" bgcolor=#d6d6d6
| 0 ||  || MBA-O || 16.32 || 3.0 km || multiple || 1996–2021 || 31 Oct 2021 || 122 || align=left | Disc.: Spacewatch || 
|}
back to top

C 

|- id="1996 CK3" bgcolor=#fefefe
| 0 ||  || MBA-I || 18.18 || data-sort-value="0.69" | 690 m || multiple || 1996–2021 || 04 Sep 2021 || 52 || align=left | Disc.: Spacewatch || 
|- id="1996 CS3" bgcolor=#d6d6d6
| 0 ||  || MBA-O || 16.95 || 2.3 km || multiple || 1996–2021 || 14 Oct 2021 || 43 || align=left | Disc.: SpacewatchAdded on 21 August 2021 || 
|- id="1996 CK6" bgcolor=#d6d6d6
| 0 ||  || MBA-O || 16.66 || 2.6 km || multiple || 1996–2021 || 03 Aug 2021 || 63 || align=left | Disc.: Spacewatch || 
|- id="1996 CL6" bgcolor=#d6d6d6
| 0 ||  || MBA-O || 17.04 || 2.2 km || multiple || 1996–2021 || 08 Sep 2021 || 54 || align=left | Disc.: SpacewatchAdded on 21 August 2021 || 
|- id="1996 CS9" bgcolor=#fefefe
| 0 ||  || MBA-I || 17.32 || 1.0 km || multiple || 1996–2021 || 05 Dec 2021 || 305 || align=left | Disc.: Spacewatch || 
|}
back to top

E 

|- id="1996 EO5" bgcolor=#d6d6d6
| 0 ||  || MBA-O || 17.09 || 2.1 km || multiple || 1996–2022 || 26 Jan 2022 || 99 || align=left | Disc.: Spacewatch || 
|- id="1996 EX10" bgcolor=#E9E9E9
| 0 ||  || MBA-M || 17.6 || 1.7 km || multiple || 1996–2020 || 29 Jul 2020 || 49 || align=left | Disc.: SpacewatchAdded on 22 July 2020Alt.: 2010 BN145, 2010 OL144 || 
|- id="1996 ET14" bgcolor=#fefefe
| 0 ||  || MBA-I || 17.4 || data-sort-value="0.98" | 980 m || multiple || 1996–2021 || 05 Feb 2021 || 166 || align=left | Disc.: SpacewatchAlt.: 2004 PL22 || 
|- id="1996 EN16" bgcolor=#fefefe
| 1 ||  || MBA-I || 18.7 || data-sort-value="0.54" | 540 m || multiple || 1996–2020 || 16 May 2020 || 87 || align=left | Disc.: Spacewatch || 
|}
back to top

F 

|- id="1996 FT1" bgcolor=#FFC2E0
| 9 ||  || APO || 24.4 || data-sort-value="0.047" | 47 m || single || 9 days || 28 Mar 1996 || 17 || align=left | Disc.: Spacewatch || 
|- id="1996 FQ3" bgcolor=#FFC2E0
| 0 ||  || AMO || 21.1 || data-sort-value="0.25" | 220 m || multiple || 1996-2022 || 01 Feb 2022 || 153 || align=left | Disc.: NEAT/GEODSS || 
|- id="1996 FQ9" bgcolor=#d6d6d6
| 0 ||  || MBA-O || 17.01 || 2.2 km || multiple || 1996–2021 || 08 May 2021 || 106 || align=left | Disc.: SpacewatchAlt.: 2013 RQ126 || 
|- id="1996 FU9" bgcolor=#fefefe
| 0 ||  || MBA-I || 18.14 || data-sort-value="0.70" | 700 m || multiple || 1996–2021 || 16 May 2021 || 94 || align=left | Disc.: Spacewatch || 
|- id="1996 FY9" bgcolor=#E9E9E9
| 0 ||  || MBA-M || 17.87 || data-sort-value="0.79" | 790 m || multiple || 1996–2021 || 12 May 2021 || 67 || align=left | Disc.: SpacewatchAdded on 11 May 2021Alt.: 2004 DS2, 2012 AE13 || 
|- id="1996 FP14" bgcolor=#E9E9E9
| 0 ||  || MBA-M || 17.85 || data-sort-value="0.80" | 800 m || multiple || 1996–2021 || 10 May 2021 || 87 || align=left | Disc.: Spacewatch || 
|- id="1996 FF25" bgcolor=#d6d6d6
| 0 ||  || MBA-O || 16.32 || 3.0 km || multiple || 1996–2021 || 09 Nov 2021 || 137 || align=left | Disc.: Spacewatch || 
|}
back to top

G 

|- id="1996 GQ" bgcolor=#FFC2E0
| 0 || 1996 GQ || APO || 23.1 || data-sort-value="0.211" | 211 m || multiple || 1996–2010 || 14 Apr 2010 || 84 || align=left | Disc.: SpacewatchAMO at MPC || 
|- id="1996 GZ4" bgcolor=#fefefe
| 0 ||  || MBA-I || 18.0 || data-sort-value="0.75" | 750 m || multiple || 1996–2020 || 09 Oct 2020 || 188 || align=left | Disc.: Spacewatch || 
|- id="1996 GO7" bgcolor=#E9E9E9
| 0 ||  || MBA-M || 18.19 || data-sort-value="0.68" | 680 m || multiple || 1996–2021 || 13 Apr 2021 || 68 || align=left | Disc.: SpacewatchAlt.: 2015 XY264 || 
|- id="1996 GU7" bgcolor=#d6d6d6
| 0 ||  || MBA-O || 16.3 || 3.1 km || multiple || 1996–2020 || 17 Dec 2020 || 82 || align=left | Disc.: SpacewatchAlt.: 2011 BC66 || 
|- id="1996 GR10" bgcolor=#E9E9E9
| 1 ||  = (619157) || MBA-M || 17.75 || data-sort-value="0.94" | 940 m || multiple || 1996–2022 || 20 Oct 2022 || 76 || align=left | Disc.: Spacewatch || 
|}
back to top

H 

|- id="1996 HN" bgcolor=#FFC2E0
| 5 || 1996 HN || AMO || 21.5 || data-sort-value="0.18" | 180 m || single || 63 days || 21 Jun 1996 || 34 || align=left | Disc.: Spacewatch || 
|- id="1996 HM6" bgcolor=#fefefe
| 0 ||  || MBA-I || 19.46 || data-sort-value="0.38" | 380 m || multiple || 1996–2020 || 14 Jul 2020 || 43 || align=left | Disc.: SpacewatchAdded on 24 August 2020 || 
|- id="1996 HH27" bgcolor=#fefefe
| 0 ||  = (619158) || MBA-I || 17.8 || data-sort-value="0.82" | 820 m || multiple || 1996–2021 || 11 Jun 2021 || 153 || align=left | Disc.: Spacewatch || 
|- id="1996 HJ27" bgcolor=#fefefe
| 0 ||  || MBA-I || 17.9 || data-sort-value="0.78" | 780 m || multiple || 1996–2019 || 31 Dec 2019 || 81 || align=left | Disc.: La Silla Obs.Alt.: 2010 FH142 || 
|- id="1996 HL27" bgcolor=#fefefe
| 0 ||  || MBA-I || 18.64 || data-sort-value="0.56" | 560 m || multiple || 1996–2021 || 18 Mar 2021 || 83 || align=left | Disc.: No observationsAdded on 22 July 2020 || 
|- id="1996 HM27" bgcolor=#E9E9E9
| 0 ||  || MBA-M || 17.40 || 1.4 km || multiple || 1996–2021 || 18 Mar 2021 || 87 || align=left | Disc.: SpacewatchAdded on 11 May 2021 || 
|}
back to top

J 

|- id="1996 JA1" bgcolor=#FFC2E0
| 4 ||  || APO || 21.0 || data-sort-value="0.22" | 220 m || single || 5 days || 19 May 1996 || 344 || align=left | Disc.: Catalina StationPotentially hazardous object || 
|- id="1996 JS7" bgcolor=#E9E9E9
| 0 ||  || MBA-M || 17.23 || 1.1 km || multiple || 1996–2021 || 01 Jul 2021 || 153 || align=left | Disc.: SpacewatchAlt.: 2006 WG168, 2014 XG44 || 
|- id="1996 JN12" bgcolor=#d6d6d6
| 0 ||  || MBA-O || 15.70 || 4.0 km || multiple || 1996–2021 || 04 Dec 2021 || 215 || align=left | Disc.: Spacewatch || 
|- id="1996 JC14" bgcolor=#d6d6d6
| 0 ||  || MBA-O || 16.15 || 3.3 km || multiple || 1996–2021 || 30 Nov 2021 || 166 || align=left | Disc.: Spacewatch || 
|- id="1996 JB15" bgcolor=#fefefe
| 0 ||  || MBA-I || 18.4 || data-sort-value="0.62" | 620 m || multiple || 1996–2020 || 23 May 2020 || 92 || align=left | Disc.: Spacewatch || 
|- id="1996 JR15" bgcolor=#E9E9E9
| 0 ||  || MBA-M || 17.48 || 1.3 km || multiple || 1996–2021 || 12 May 2021 || 63 || align=left | Disc.: Spacewatch || 
|- id="1996 JW15" bgcolor=#fefefe
| 0 ||  || MBA-I || 18.32 || data-sort-value="0.64" | 640 m || multiple || 1996–2021 || 13 Sep 2021 || 70 || align=left | Disc.: Spacewatch || 
|}
back to top

K 

|- id="1996 KE" bgcolor=#FFC2E0
| 5 || 1996 KE || AMO || 19.2 || data-sort-value="0.51" | 510 m || single || 66 days || 18 Jul 1996 || 80 || align=left | Disc.: NEAT/GEODSS || 
|- id="1996 KV1" bgcolor=#C2E0FF
| 2 ||  || TNO || 7.3 || 178 km || multiple || 1996–2016 || 29 May 2016 || 27 || align=left | Disc.: Mauna Kea Obs.LoUTNOs, cubewano (hot) || 
|- id="1996 KX1" bgcolor=#C2E0FF
| E ||  || TNO || 8.5 || 94 km || single || 2 days || 24 May 1996 || 8 || align=left | Disc.: Mauna Kea Obs.LoUTNOs, plutino? || 
|- id="1996 KY1" bgcolor=#C2E0FF
| E ||  || TNO || 8.0 || 119 km || single || 8 days || 24 May 1996 || 8 || align=left | Disc.: Mauna Kea Obs.LoUTNOs, plutino? || 
|- id="1996 KF3" bgcolor=#fefefe
| 0 ||  || MBA-I || 18.31 || data-sort-value="0.65" | 650 m || multiple || 1996–2021 || 30 Oct 2021 || 46 || align=left | Disc.: LINEARAdded on 17 January 2021Alt.: 2020 DQ5 || 
|}
back to top

M 

|- id="1996 MQ" bgcolor=#FFC2E0
| 5 || 1996 MQ || APO || 24.5 || data-sort-value="0.045" | 45 m || single || 23 days || 17 Jul 1996 || 72 || align=left | Disc.: LINEARAMO at MPC || 
|}
back to top

P 

|- id="1996 PW" bgcolor=#C2E0FF
| – || 1996 PW || TNO || 13.9 || 10 km || multiple || 1996–1997 || 28 Dec 1997 || 268 || align=left | Disc.: NEAT/GEODSSLoUTNOs, damocloid || 
|- id="1996 PH2" bgcolor=#FA8072
| – ||  || MCA || 20.0 || data-sort-value="0.30" | 300 m || single || 25 days || 07 Sep 1996 || 32 || align=left | Disc.: NEAT/GEODSS || 
|}
back to top

R 

|- id="1996 RP4" bgcolor=#fefefe
| 0 ||  || MBA-I || 17.48 || data-sort-value="0.95" | 950 m || multiple || 1996–2022 || 21 Jan 2022 || 335 || align=left | Disc.: NEAT/GEODSS || 
|- id="1996 RG6" bgcolor=#E9E9E9
| 0 ||  || MBA-M || 18.03 || data-sort-value="0.74" | 740 m || multiple || 1996–2021 || 27 Nov 2021 || 79 || align=left | Disc.: Spacewatch || 
|- id="1996 RV6" bgcolor=#E9E9E9
| 0 ||  || MBA-M || 18.38 || data-sort-value="0.63" | 630 m || multiple || 1996–2021 || 06 Nov 2021 || 73 || align=left | Disc.: SpacewatchAdded on 11 May 2021Alt.: 2012 JE56 || 
|- id="1996 RQ7" bgcolor=#fefefe
| 1 ||  || MBA-I || 19.3 || data-sort-value="0.41" | 410 m || multiple || 1996–2020 || 11 Oct 2020 || 49 || align=left | Disc.: Spacewatch || 
|- id="1996 RG8" bgcolor=#fefefe
| 0 ||  || MBA-I || 18.3 || data-sort-value="0.65" | 650 m || multiple || 1996–2020 || 25 Dec 2020 || 56 || align=left | Disc.: SpacewatchAdded on 9 March 2021 || 
|- id="1996 RM8" bgcolor=#E9E9E9
| 0 ||  || MBA-M || 17.82 || 1.1 km || multiple || 1996–2021 || 01 Jul 2021 || 95 || align=left | Disc.: Spacewatch || 
|- id="1996 RP8" bgcolor=#C2FFFF
| 0 ||  || JT || 14.12 || 8.3 km || multiple || 1996–2023 || 22 Jan 2023 || 236 || align=left | Disc.: SpacewatchGreek camp (L4) || 
|- id="1996 RR8" bgcolor=#E9E9E9
| 0 ||  || MBA-M || 17.91 || 1.1 km || multiple || 1996–2021 || 15 May 2021 || 56 || align=left | Disc.: Spacewatch || 
|- id="1996 RM10" bgcolor=#d6d6d6
| 0 ||  || MBA-O || 16.8 || 2.4 km || multiple || 1996–2020 || 24 Dec 2020 || 86 || align=left | Disc.: SpacewatchAlt.: 2008 UA259 || 
|- id="1996 RP10" bgcolor=#E9E9E9
| 2 ||  || MBA-M || 18.7 || data-sort-value="0.76" | 760 m || multiple || 1996–2013 || 04 Sep 2013 || 18 || align=left | Disc.: Spacewatch || 
|- id="1996 RH11" bgcolor=#d6d6d6
| 0 ||  || MBA-O || 17.05 || 2.2 km || multiple || 1996–2021 || 07 Sep 2021 || 121 || align=left | Disc.: SpacewatchAlt.: 2005 GZ169 || 
|- id="1996 RC13" bgcolor=#fefefe
| 0 ||  || MBA-I || 18.62 || data-sort-value="0.56" | 560 m || multiple || 1996–2022 || 04 Jan 2022 || 48 || align=left | Disc.: SpacewatchAdded on 17 June 2021 || 
|- id="1996 RH14" bgcolor=#E9E9E9
| 0 ||  || MBA-M || 17.0 || 1.7 km || multiple || 1996–2020 || 20 Feb 2020 || 149 || align=left | Disc.: Spacewatch || 
|- id="1996 RE15" bgcolor=#E9E9E9
| 2 ||  || MBA-M || 19.55 || data-sort-value="0.53" | 530 m || multiple || 1996-2022 || 23 Oct 2022 || 23 || align=left | Disc.: Spacewatch || 
|- id="1996 RO15" bgcolor=#E9E9E9
| 2 ||  || MBA-M || 18.6 || 1.1 km || multiple || 1996–2019 || 19 Nov 2019 || 31 || align=left | Disc.: SpacewatchAdded on 22 July 2020Alt.: 2014 OW277 || 
|- id="1996 RY15" bgcolor=#E9E9E9
| 0 ||  || MBA-M || 17.7 || 1.2 km || multiple || 1996–2020 || 22 Apr 2020 || 43 || align=left | Disc.: SpacewatchAlt.: 2000 QO232 || 
|- id="1996 RJ16" bgcolor=#fefefe
| 0 ||  || MBA-I || 18.3 || data-sort-value="0.65" | 650 m || multiple || 1996–2019 || 04 Dec 2019 || 82 || align=left | Disc.: SpacewatchAlt.: 2008 YY83, 2015 TS191 || 
|- id="1996 RR16" bgcolor=#d6d6d6
| 0 ||  || MBA-O || 16.1 || 3.4 km || multiple || 1996–2021 || 18 Jan 2021 || 92 || align=left | Disc.: Spacewatch || 
|- id="1996 RX16" bgcolor=#E9E9E9
| 0 ||  || MBA-M || 17.0 || 2.2 km || multiple || 1996–2020 || 07 Jan 2020 || 141 || align=left | Disc.: SpacewatchAlt.: 2010 OM102 || 
|- id="1996 RY16" bgcolor=#d6d6d6
| 0 ||  || MBA-O || 17.1 || 2.1 km || multiple || 1996–2021 || 05 Jun 2021 || 46 || align=left | Disc.: SpacewatchAlt.: 2007 YA90 || 
|- id="1996 RC17" bgcolor=#fefefe
| 2 ||  || MBA-I || 18.8 || data-sort-value="0.52" | 520 m || multiple || 1996–2019 || 06 Sep 2019 || 162 || align=left | Disc.: SpacewatchAlt.: 2019 NZ7 || 
|- id="1996 RD17" bgcolor=#d6d6d6
| 0 ||  || MBA-O || 16.54 || 2.7 km || multiple || 1996–2021 || 13 Apr 2021 || 96 || align=left | Disc.: SpacewatchAlt.: 2010 FR99 || 
|- id="1996 RQ17" bgcolor=#E9E9E9
| 0 ||  || MBA-M || 18.0 || 1.4 km || multiple || 1996–2018 || 07 Sep 2018 || 41 || align=left | Disc.: SpacewatchAlt.: 2014 WY599 || 
|- id="1996 RY18" bgcolor=#d6d6d6
| 0 ||  || MBA-O || 16.6 || 2.7 km || multiple || 1996–2020 || 04 Jan 2020 || 108 || align=left | Disc.: SpacewatchAlt.: 2006 KW129, 2007 UU12, 2018 RU19 || 
|- id="1996 RO20" bgcolor=#C2FFFF
| 0 ||  || JT || 14.03 || 8.7 km || multiple || 1996–2023 || 21 Jan 2023 || 196 || align=left | Disc.: SpacewatchGreek camp (L4) || 
|- id="1996 RP20" bgcolor=#fefefe
| 0 ||  || MBA-I || 18.23 || data-sort-value="0.67" | 670 m || multiple || 1996–2021 || 29 Oct 2021 || 94 || align=left | Disc.: Spacewatch || 
|- id="1996 RQ20" bgcolor=#C2E0FF
| 2 ||  || TNO || 6.9 || 173 km || multiple || 1996–2013 || 07 Oct 2013 || 53 || align=left | Disc.: Palomar Obs.LoUTNOs, other TNO, BR-mag: 1.56; taxonomy: IR || 
|- id="1996 RT20" bgcolor=#FA8072
| – ||  || MCA || 19.3 || data-sort-value="0.41" | 410 m || single || 15 days || 20 Sep 1996 || 12 || align=left | Disc.: Spacewatch || 
|- id="1996 RU20" bgcolor=#fefefe
| 1 ||  || MBA-I || 19.4 || data-sort-value="0.39" | 390 m || multiple || 1996–2020 || 15 Oct 2020 || 35 || align=left | Disc.: Spacewatch || 
|- id="1996 RE21" bgcolor=#E9E9E9
| 0 ||  || MBA-M || 17.6 || 1.3 km || multiple || 1996–2020 || 29 Jan 2020 || 57 || align=left | Disc.: Spacewatch || 
|- id="1996 RX21" bgcolor=#fefefe
| 2 ||  || MBA-I || 19.2 || data-sort-value="0.43" | 430 m || multiple || 1996–2020 || 19 Apr 2020 || 42 || align=left | Disc.: SpacewatchAdded on 22 July 2020 || 
|- id="1996 RC22" bgcolor=#E9E9E9
| 0 ||  || MBA-M || 17.48 || data-sort-value="0.95" | 950 m || multiple || 1996–2021 || 28 Nov 2021 || 191 || align=left | Disc.: Spacewatch || 
|- id="1996 RR22" bgcolor=#E9E9E9
| 0 ||  || MBA-M || 17.0 || 1.2 km || multiple || 1996–2021 || 01 Dec 2021 || 61 || align=left | Disc.: SpacewatchAdded on 17 January 2021Alt.: 2015 DT78 || 
|- id="1996 RK23" bgcolor=#fefefe
| 0 ||  || MBA-I || 17.73 || data-sort-value="0.85" | 850 m || multiple || 1996–2021 || 29 Oct 2021 || 251 || align=left | Disc.: Spacewatch || 
|- id="1996 RX33" bgcolor=#C7FF8F
| E ||  || CEN || 9.3 || 77 km || single || 13 days || 21 Sep 1996 || 9 || align=left | Disc.: Spacewatch || 
|- id="1996 RG34" bgcolor=#C2FFFF
| 0 ||  || JT || 13.79 || 9.9 km || multiple || 1996–2023 || 14 Jan 2023 || 259 || align=left | Disc.: SpacewatchGreek camp (L4) || 
|- id="1996 RJ34" bgcolor=#FA8072
| 0 ||  || MCA || 19.59 || data-sort-value="0.36" | 360 m || multiple || 1996–2021 || 30 Jun 2021 || 37 || align=left | Disc.: No observationsAdded on 19 October 2020 || 
|}
back to top

S 

|- id="1996 SC3" bgcolor=#fefefe
| 0 ||  || HUN || 18.16 || data-sort-value="0.69" | 690 m || multiple || 1991–2020 || 19 Jan 2020 || 124 || align=left | Disc.: Spacewatch || 
|- id="1996 SK3" bgcolor=#fefefe
| 1 ||  || MBA-I || 18.6 || data-sort-value="0.57" | 570 m || multiple || 1996–2020 || 20 Oct 2020 || 50 || align=left | Disc.: SpacewatchAdded on 11 May 2021Alt.: 2013 RC5 || 
|- id="1996 SM3" bgcolor=#fefefe
| 0 ||  || MBA-I || 18.58 || data-sort-value="0.57" | 570 m || multiple || 1996–2021 || 12 May 2021 || 71 || align=left | Disc.: SpacewatchAdded on 11 May 2021Alt.: 2021 GT40 || 
|- id="1996 SU5" bgcolor=#fefefe
| 1 ||  || MBA-I || 19.0 || data-sort-value="0.47" | 470 m || multiple || 1996–2017 || 21 Sep 2017 || 29 || align=left | Disc.: SpacewatchAdded on 24 December 2021 || 
|- id="1996 SG9" bgcolor=#fefefe
| 0 ||  || MBA-I || 17.89 || data-sort-value="0.79" | 790 m || multiple || 1994–2021 || 08 May 2021 || 130 || align=left | Disc.: Spacewatch || 
|}
back to top

T 

|- id="1996 TC1" bgcolor=#FFC2E0
| 8 ||  || APO || 23.9 || data-sort-value="0.059" | 59 m || single || 7 days || 11 Oct 1996 || 14 || align=left | Disc.: Spacewatch || 
|- id="1996 TH1" bgcolor=#d6d6d6
| 0 ||  || MBA-O || 16.1 || 3.4 km || multiple || 1996–2021 || 14 Jan 2021 || 124 || align=left | Disc.: Prescott Obs.Alt.: 2013 SD66, 2016 CN89, 2019 TF10 || 
|- id="1996 TP6" bgcolor=#FFC2E0
| 1 ||  || APO || 20.0 || data-sort-value="0.36" | 360 m || multiple || 1996–2013 || 12 Oct 2013 || 63 || align=left | Disc.: Spacewatch || 
|- id="1996 TA9" bgcolor=#FA8072
| 6 ||  || MCA || 19.8 || data-sort-value="0.61" | 610 m || single || 38 days || 19 Nov 1996 || 34 || align=left | Disc.: NEAT/GEODSS || 
|- id="1996 TD9" bgcolor=#FFC2E0
| 4 ||  || APO || 23.7 || data-sort-value="0.065" | 65 m || multiple || 1996–2016 || 23 Oct 2016 || 66 || align=left | Disc.: NEAT/GEODSS || 
|- id="1996 TO11" bgcolor=#FA8072
| 0 ||  || MCA || 18.12 || data-sort-value="0.71" | 710 m || multiple || 1996–2021 || 22 May 2021 || 335 || align=left | Disc.: Nihondaira Obs. || 
|- id="1996 TX11" bgcolor=#fefefe
| 0 ||  || MBA-I || 18.7 || data-sort-value="0.54" | 540 m || multiple || 1996–2020 || 07 Dec 2020 || 55 || align=left | Disc.: Spacewatch || 
|- id="1996 TK16" bgcolor=#fefefe
| 0 ||  || MBA-I || 17.03 || 1.2 km || multiple || 1996–2021 || 02 May 2021 || 183 || align=left | Disc.: Spacewatch || 
|- id="1996 TY22" bgcolor=#d6d6d6
| 0 ||  || MBA-O || 16.7 || 2.5 km || multiple || 1996–2020 || 23 Dec 2020 || 59 || align=left | Disc.: Spacewatch || 
|- id="1996 TC23" bgcolor=#fefefe
| 0 ||  || MBA-I || 18.75 || data-sort-value="0.53" | 530 m || multiple || 1996–2021 || 30 Jul 2021 || 46 || align=left | Disc.: SpacewatchAdded on 11 May 2021Alt.: 2014 QT238 || 
|- id="1996 TG24" bgcolor=#E9E9E9
| 0 ||  || MBA-M || 18.31 || data-sort-value="0.65" | 650 m || multiple || 1996–2021 || 09 Nov 2021 || 79 || align=left | Disc.: Spacewatch || 
|- id="1996 TN26" bgcolor=#E9E9E9
| 0 ||  || MBA-M || 17.22 || 1.1 km || multiple || 1996–2022 || 19 Jan 2022 || 127 || align=left | Disc.: SpacewatchAdded on 22 July 2020Alt.: 2017 YD15 || 
|- id="1996 TV27" bgcolor=#E9E9E9
| – ||  || MBA-M || 18.6 || 1.1 km || single || 11 days || 18 Oct 1996 || 12 || align=left | Disc.: Spacewatch || 
|- id="1996 TC28" bgcolor=#d6d6d6
| 0 ||  || MBA-O || 16.59 || 2.7 km || multiple || 1996–2021 || 18 May 2021 || 88 || align=left | Disc.: SpacewatchAlt.: 2017 QY90 || 
|- id="1996 TF28" bgcolor=#E9E9E9
| 0 ||  || MBA-M || 18.93 || data-sort-value="0.49" | 490 m || multiple || 1996–2021 || 27 Nov 2021 || 109 || align=left | Disc.: Spacewatch || 
|- id="1996 TJ28" bgcolor=#E9E9E9
| – ||  || MBA-M || 19.5 || data-sort-value="0.37" | 370 m || single || 9 days || 16 Oct 1996 || 14 || align=left | Disc.: Spacewatch || 
|- id="1996 TK28" bgcolor=#E9E9E9
| 2 ||  || MBA-M || 17.8 || 1.5 km || multiple || 1996–2018 || 08 Aug 2018 || 49 || align=left | Disc.: SpacewatchAlt.: 2005 UC124 || 
|- id="1996 TG30" bgcolor=#fefefe
| 0 ||  || MBA-I || 18.75 || data-sort-value="0.53" | 530 m || multiple || 1996–2021 || 02 Oct 2021 || 60 || align=left | Disc.: Spacewatch || 
|- id="1996 TU31" bgcolor=#d6d6d6
| 0 ||  || MBA-O || 17.2 || 2.0 km || multiple || 1996–2019 || 14 Jan 2019 || 49 || align=left | Disc.: Spacewatch || 
|- id="1996 TW31" bgcolor=#d6d6d6
| 0 ||  || MBA-O || 16.58 || 2.7 km || multiple || 1994–2022 || 11 Apr 2022 || 95 || align=left | Disc.: SpacewatchAdded on 22 July 2020Alt.: 2016 GU124 || 
|- id="1996 TC32" bgcolor=#fefefe
| 0 ||  || MBA-I || 18.72 || data-sort-value="0.54" | 540 m || multiple || 1996–2021 || 06 Nov 2021 || 100 || align=left | Disc.: SpacewatchAdded on 21 August 2021 || 
|- id="1996 TH32" bgcolor=#d6d6d6
| 0 ||  || MBA-O || 16.59 || 2.7 km || multiple || 1996–2021 || 08 May 2021 || 77 || align=left | Disc.: SpacewatchAlt.: 2013 UM41 || 
|- id="1996 TO32" bgcolor=#fefefe
| 0 ||  || MBA-I || 18.00 || data-sort-value="0.75" | 750 m || multiple || 1996–2021 || 09 Apr 2021 || 97 || align=left | Disc.: SpacewatchAlt.: 2019 QB24 || 
|- id="1996 TY32" bgcolor=#d6d6d6
| 0 ||  || MBA-O || 16.6 || 2.7 km || multiple || 1996–2019 || 04 Dec 2019 || 95 || align=left | Disc.: Spacewatch || 
|- id="1996 TL34" bgcolor=#fefefe
| 2 ||  || MBA-I || 18.3 || data-sort-value="0.65" | 650 m || multiple || 1996–2017 || 15 Dec 2017 || 69 || align=left | Disc.: SpacewatchAlt.: 2010 VM175 || 
|- id="1996 TW34" bgcolor=#d6d6d6
| 0 ||  || MBA-O || 17.0 || 2.2 km || multiple || 1996–2020 || 21 Jun 2020 || 59 || align=left | Disc.: Spacewatch || 
|- id="1996 TM35" bgcolor=#E9E9E9
| 0 ||  || MBA-M || 17.2 || 2.0 km || multiple || 1996–2021 || 17 Jan 2021 || 91 || align=left | Disc.: SpacewatchAdded on 22 July 2020Alt.: 2008 FO22, 2015 XM300 || 
|- id="1996 TY42" bgcolor=#E9E9E9
| 1 ||  || MBA-M || 17.2 || 1.1 km || multiple || 1996–2020 || 15 Sep 2020 || 64 || align=left | Disc.: Spacewatch || 
|- id="1996 TU43" bgcolor=#E9E9E9
| 0 ||  || MBA-M || 18.34 || data-sort-value="0.64" | 640 m || multiple || 1996–2021 || 31 Oct 2021 || 25 || align=left | Disc.: SpacewatchAdded on 24 August 2020 || 
|- id="1996 TV43" bgcolor=#d6d6d6
| 0 ||  || MBA-O || 16.7 || 2.5 km || multiple || 1996–2020 || 05 Jan 2020 || 43 || align=left | Disc.: SpacewatchAdded on 21 August 2021 || 
|- id="1996 TG44" bgcolor=#fefefe
| 1 ||  || MBA-I || 18.6 || data-sort-value="0.57" | 570 m || multiple || 1996–2020 || 12 Nov 2020 || 66 || align=left | Disc.: SpacewatchAlt.: 2010 UJ123 || 
|- id="1996 TM44" bgcolor=#E9E9E9
| 0 ||  || MBA-M || 17.54 || 1.7 km || multiple || 1996–2021 || 17 Apr 2021 || 103 || align=left | Disc.: SpacewatchAlt.: 2010 UH28 || 
|- id="1996 TY44" bgcolor=#E9E9E9
| 1 ||  || MBA-M || 17.9 || 1.5 km || multiple || 1996–2019 || 18 Nov 2019 || 42 || align=left | Disc.: SpacewatchAlt.: 2014 WK169 || 
|- id="1996 TF45" bgcolor=#E9E9E9
| 0 ||  || MBA-M || 17.95 || 1.1 km || multiple || 1996–2021 || 16 Apr 2021 || 44 || align=left | Disc.: Spacewatch || 
|- id="1996 TH45" bgcolor=#d6d6d6
| 2 ||  || MBA-O || 18.2 || 1.3 km || multiple || 1996–2018 || 11 Nov 2018 || 30 || align=left | Disc.: SpacewatchAdded on 24 December 2021 || 
|- id="1996 TM45" bgcolor=#fefefe
| 0 ||  || MBA-I || 19.17 || data-sort-value="0.44" | 440 m || multiple || 1996–2021 || 10 Nov 2021 || 61 || align=left | Disc.: SpacewatchAdded on 5 November 2021 || 
|- id="1996 TP45" bgcolor=#E9E9E9
| 0 ||  || MBA-M || 17.01 || 1.7 km || multiple || 1996–2020 || 24 Mar 2020 || 103 || align=left | Disc.: SpacewatchAlt.: 2018 VB74 || 
|- id="1996 TE46" bgcolor=#fefefe
| 1 ||  || MBA-I || 18.1 || data-sort-value="0.71" | 710 m || multiple || 1996–2019 || 02 Nov 2019 || 50 || align=left | Disc.: Spacewatch || 
|- id="1996 TX60" bgcolor=#d6d6d6
| 0 ||  || MBA-O || 16.4 || 2.9 km || multiple || 1960–2020 || 20 Apr 2020 || 132 || align=left | Disc.: La Silla Obs.Alt.: 2006 OX15, 4717 P-L || 
|- id="1996 TD67" bgcolor=#fefefe
| 3 ||  || MBA-I || 19.2 || data-sort-value="0.43" | 430 m || multiple || 1996–2021 || 08 Dec 2021 || 36 || align=left | Disc.: SpacewatchAdded on 24 December 2021 || 
|- id="1996 TT69" bgcolor=#d6d6d6
| 0 ||  || MBA-O || 16.4 || 2.9 km || multiple || 1996–2021 || 13 Jun 2021 || 120 || align=left | Disc.: Spacewatch || 
|}
back to top

U 

|- id="1996 UK3" bgcolor=#d6d6d6
| 1 ||  || MBA-O || 17.1 || 2.1 km || multiple || 1996–2019 || 01 Nov 2019 || 49 || align=left | Disc.: Spacewatch || 
|}
back to top

V 

|- id="1996 VB3" bgcolor=#FFC2E0
| 0 ||  || APO || 22.09 || data-sort-value="0.14" | 140 m || multiple || 1996–2021 || 02 Dec 2021 || 200 || align=left | Disc.: Spacewatch || 
|- id="1996 VZ4" bgcolor=#FFC2E0
| 7 ||  || AMO || 24.2 || data-sort-value="0.051" | 51 m || single || 1 day || 14 Nov 1996 || 5 || align=left | Disc.: Spacewatch || 
|- id="1996 VN10" bgcolor=#E9E9E9
| 0 ||  || MBA-M || 17.61 || 1.3 km || multiple || 1996–2021 || 08 Aug 2021 || 44 || align=left | Disc.: SpacewatchAdded on 21 August 2021 || 
|- id="1996 VP10" bgcolor=#E9E9E9
| 0 ||  || MBA-M || 17.3 || 1.9 km || multiple || 1996–2019 || 08 Nov 2019 || 56 || align=left | Disc.: Spacewatch || 
|- id="1996 VP13" bgcolor=#fefefe
| 0 ||  || MBA-I || 18.6 || data-sort-value="0.57" | 570 m || multiple || 1996–2022 || 04 Jan 2022 || 52 || align=left | Disc.: SpacewatchAdded on 29 January 2022 || 
|- id="1996 VC14" bgcolor=#d6d6d6
| 0 ||  || MBA-O || 17.2 || 2.0 km || multiple || 1996–2015 || 16 Jan 2015 || 32 || align=left | Disc.: SpacewatchAlt.: 2007 TO273 || 
|- id="1996 VO14" bgcolor=#fefefe
| 0 ||  || MBA-I || 18.91 || data-sort-value="0.49" | 490 m || multiple || 1996–2021 || 17 Feb 2021 || 37 || align=left | Disc.: SpacewatchAdded on 5 November 2021 || 
|- id="1996 VE16" bgcolor=#fefefe
| 0 ||  || MBA-I || 18.7 || data-sort-value="0.54" | 540 m || multiple || 1996–2020 || 02 Feb 2020 || 42 || align=left | Disc.: SpacewatchAdded on 22 July 2020Alt.: 2011 UO74 || 
|- id="1996 VH17" bgcolor=#d6d6d6
| 0 ||  || MBA-O || 15.63 || 4.2 km || multiple || 1996–2022 || 05 Jan 2022 || 135 || align=left | Disc.: SpacewatchAlt.: 2010 JO11 || 
|- id="1996 VD19" bgcolor=#d6d6d6
| 0 ||  || MBA-O || 17.0 || 2.2 km || multiple || 1996–2019 || 19 Dec 2019 || 64 || align=left | Disc.: SpacewatchAdded on 22 July 2020 || 
|- id="1996 VP19" bgcolor=#E9E9E9
| – ||  || MBA-M || 18.5 || data-sort-value="0.59" | 590 m || single || 11 days || 18 Nov 1996 || 9 || align=left | Disc.: Spacewatch || 
|- id="1996 VU19" bgcolor=#E9E9E9
| 1 ||  || MBA-M || 17.51 || 1.3 km || multiple || 1996–2021 || 26 Nov 2021 || 71 || align=left | Disc.: Spacewatch || 
|- id="1996 VY19" bgcolor=#E9E9E9
| 0 ||  || MBA-M || 16.80 || 1.8 km || multiple || 1996–2021 || 04 Aug 2021 || 144 || align=left | Disc.: SpacewatchAlt.: 2012 JB4 || 
|- id="1996 VL22" bgcolor=#d6d6d6
| 0 ||  || MBA-O || 17.80 || 1.5 km || multiple || 1996–2018 || 04 Dec 2018 || 49 || align=left | Disc.: SpacewatchAdded on 11 May 2021Alt.: 2018 SL18 || 
|- id="1996 VM22" bgcolor=#d6d6d6
| 0 ||  || MBA-O || 15.7 || 4.0 km || multiple || 1995–2021 || 19 Jan 2021 || 176 || align=left | Disc.: SpacewatchAlt.: 2010 JM49 || 
|- id="1996 VT24" bgcolor=#fefefe
| 0 ||  || MBA-I || 19.26 || data-sort-value="0.42" | 420 m || multiple || 1996–2021 || 31 Aug 2021 || 61 || align=left | Disc.: SpacewatchAdded on 17 January 2021 || 
|- id="1996 VE26" bgcolor=#E9E9E9
| 0 ||  || MBA-M || 17.6 || data-sort-value="0.90" | 900 m || multiple || 1996–2021 || 06 Jan 2021 || 112 || align=left | Disc.: Spacewatch || 
|- id="1996 VO26" bgcolor=#d6d6d6
| 0 ||  || MBA-O || 17.75 || 1.6 km || multiple || 1996–2021 || 13 Jul 2021 || 42 || align=left | Disc.: SpacewatchAdded on 11 May 2021 || 
|- id="1996 VH27" bgcolor=#fefefe
| 0 ||  || MBA-I || 18.04 || data-sort-value="0.73" | 730 m || multiple || 1996–2021 || 25 Nov 2021 || 133 || align=left | Disc.: Spacewatch || 
|- id="1996 VW28" bgcolor=#fefefe
| 0 ||  = (619159) || MBA-I || 18.2 || data-sort-value="0.68" | 680 m || multiple || 1996–2021 || 12 May 2021 || 87 || align=left | Disc.: SpacewatchAdded on 17 June 2021Alt.: 2006 WG54 || 
|- id="1996 VX28" bgcolor=#E9E9E9
| 0 ||  || MBA-M || 17.38 || data-sort-value="0.99" | 990 m || multiple || 1996–2021 || 30 Nov 2021 || 93 || align=left | Disc.: SpacewatchAlt.: 2017 XP36 || 
|- id="1996 VC29" bgcolor=#d6d6d6
| 0 ||  || HIL || 16.7 || 2.5 km || multiple || 1996–2020 || 10 Dec 2020 || 29 || align=left | Disc.: SpacewatchAdded on 21 August 2021 || 
|- id="1996 VF29" bgcolor=#E9E9E9
| 0 ||  || MBA-M || 18.62 || data-sort-value="0.56" | 560 m || multiple || 1996–2022 || 25 Jan 2022 || 53 || align=left | Disc.: Spacewatch || 
|- id="1996 VG29" bgcolor=#d6d6d6
| 0 ||  || MBA-O || 16.8 || 2.4 km || multiple || 1996–2018 || 08 Nov 2018 || 38 || align=left | Disc.: Spacewatch || 
|- id="1996 VF31" bgcolor=#E9E9E9
| 2 ||  || MBA-M || 18.3 || data-sort-value="0.65" | 650 m || multiple || 1996–2020 || 13 Sep 2020 || 61 || align=left | Disc.: SpacewatchAdded on 22 July 2020Alt.: 2012 SE21 || 
|- id="1996 VO32" bgcolor=#E9E9E9
| 0 ||  || MBA-M || 17.31 || 1.5 km || multiple || 1996–2021 || 01 Nov 2021 || 111 || align=left | Disc.: Spacewatch || 
|- id="1996 VV32" bgcolor=#fefefe
| 0 ||  || MBA-I || 18.28 || data-sort-value="0.66" | 660 m || multiple || 1996–2020 || 07 Dec 2020 || 90 || align=left | Disc.: SpacewatchAdded on 11 May 2021Alt.: 2013 RW141 || 
|- id="1996 VX34" bgcolor=#fefefe
| 0 ||  || MBA-I || 18.14 || data-sort-value="0.70" | 700 m || multiple || 1996–2021 || 09 Jul 2021 || 86 || align=left | Disc.: Spacewatch || 
|- id="1996 VM36" bgcolor=#E9E9E9
| 0 ||  = (619160) || MBA-M || 17.6 || 1.3 km || multiple || 1996–2018 || 13 Dec 2018 || 54 || align=left | Disc.: Spacewatch || 
|- id="1996 VR36" bgcolor=#E9E9E9
| 0 ||  || MBA-M || 17.63 || data-sort-value="0.89" | 890 m || multiple || 1996–2021 || 30 Nov 2021 || 130 || align=left | Disc.: SpacewatchAdded on 22 July 2020 || 
|- id="1996 VA37" bgcolor=#fefefe
| 1 ||  || MBA-I || 18.9 || data-sort-value="0.49" | 490 m || multiple || 1996–2020 || 06 Dec 2020 || 51 || align=left | Disc.: Spacewatch || 
|- id="1996 VD37" bgcolor=#d6d6d6
| 0 ||  || MBA-O || 16.4 || 2.9 km || multiple || 1996–2019 || 25 Nov 2019 || 34 || align=left | Disc.: SpacewatchAdded on 22 July 2020Alt.: 2017 GQ15 || 
|- id="1996 VM37" bgcolor=#E9E9E9
| 0 ||  || MBA-M || 17.44 || 1.4 km || multiple || 1996–2021 || 27 Nov 2021 || 162 || align=left | Disc.: Spacewatch || 
|- id="1996 VP37" bgcolor=#fefefe
| 1 ||  || MBA-I || 19.08 || data-sort-value="0.45" | 450 m || multiple || 1996–2021 || 30 Nov 2021 || 57 || align=left | Disc.: SpacewatchAdded on 24 December 2021 || 
|- id="1996 VQ37" bgcolor=#d6d6d6
| 0 ||  || MBA-O || 17.09 || 2.1 km || multiple || 1996–2021 || 15 Apr 2021 || 53 || align=left | Disc.: SpacewatchAdded on 22 July 2020 || 
|- id="1996 VC42" bgcolor=#E9E9E9
| 0 ||  || MBA-M || 17.31 || 1.9 km || multiple || 1996–2021 || 02 May 2021 || 91 || align=left | Disc.: SpacewatchAdded on 11 May 2021Alt.: 2016 CA5 || 
|- id="1996 VD42" bgcolor=#d6d6d6
| 0 ||  || MBA-O || 17.01 || 2.2 km || multiple || 1996–2021 || 09 Apr 2021 || 43 || align=left | Disc.: Spacewatch || 
|- id="1996 VE42" bgcolor=#d6d6d6
| 0 ||  || HIL || 16.1 || 3.4 km || multiple || 1996–2020 || 15 Dec 2020 || 102 || align=left | Disc.: SpacewatchAlt.: 2006 BT259 || 
|- id="1996 VG42" bgcolor=#fefefe
| 0 ||  || MBA-I || 17.9 || data-sort-value="0.78" | 780 m || multiple || 1996–2021 || 06 Jan 2021 || 179 || align=left | Disc.: Spacewatch || 
|- id="1996 VH42" bgcolor=#E9E9E9
| 0 ||  || MBA-M || 16.77 || 1.3 km || multiple || 1996–2022 || 09 Jan 2022 || 131 || align=left | Disc.: Spacewatch || 
|- id="1996 VJ42" bgcolor=#E9E9E9
| 0 ||  || MBA-M || 17.7 || 1.6 km || multiple || 1996–2019 || 04 Dec 2019 || 49 || align=left | Disc.: Spacewatch || 
|}
back to top

W 

|- id="1996 WN1" bgcolor=#fefefe
| 0 ||  || MBA-I || 18.8 || data-sort-value="0.52" | 520 m || multiple || 1996–2020 || 24 Dec 2020 || 52 || align=left | Disc.: Spacewatch || 
|- id="1996 WY3" bgcolor=#d6d6d6
| 0 ||  || MBA-O || 16.43 || 2.9 km || multiple || 1996–2021 || 02 Oct 2021 || 90 || align=left | Disc.: Spacewatch || 
|- id="1996 WZ3" bgcolor=#E9E9E9
| 0 ||  || MBA-M || 16.76 || 1.3 km || multiple || 1996–2021 || 29 Nov 2021 || 123 || align=left | Disc.: Spacewatch || 
|}
back to top

X 

|- id="1996 XJ" bgcolor=#E9E9E9
| 0 || 1996 XJ || MBA-M || 17.4 || 1.8 km || multiple || 1996–2020 || 27 Feb 2020 || 73 || align=left | Disc.: SpacewatchAlt.: 2009 SL239 || 
|- id="1996 XR2" bgcolor=#FA8072
| 1 ||  || MCA || 19.2 || data-sort-value="0.43" | 430 m || multiple || 1996–2021 || 12 Jan 2021 || 147 || align=left | Disc.: SpacewatchAlt.: 2020 QD6 || 
|- id="1996 XZ3" bgcolor=#FA8072
| 1 ||  || MCA || 19.1 || data-sort-value="0.45" | 450 m || multiple || 1996–2021 || 04 Jan 2021 || 62 || align=left | Disc.: SpacewatchAlt.: 2013 SO104 || 
|- id="1996 XY6" bgcolor=#d6d6d6
| 0 ||  || MBA-O || 17.1 || 2.1 km || multiple || 1996–2020 || 20 Apr 2020 || 56 || align=left | Disc.: Spacewatch || 
|- id="1996 XF7" bgcolor=#fefefe
| 0 ||  || MBA-I || 18.5 || data-sort-value="0.59" | 590 m || multiple || 1996–2019 || 24 Dec 2019 || 67 || align=left | Disc.: SpacewatchAdded on 22 July 2020Alt.: 2015 HK132 || 
|- id="1996 XT7" bgcolor=#d6d6d6
| 0 ||  || MBA-O || 16.64 || 2.6 km || multiple || 1996–2022 || 06 Jan 2022 || 164 || align=left | Disc.: SpacewatchAlt.: 2009 KY20, 2010 LG10 || 
|- id="1996 XC8" bgcolor=#E9E9E9
| 0 ||  || MBA-M || 17.47 || 1.8 km || multiple || 1996–2021 || 09 Apr 2021 || 57 || align=left | Disc.: Spacewatch || 
|- id="1996 XH9" bgcolor=#E9E9E9
| 0 ||  || MBA-M || 17.78 || data-sort-value="0.83" | 830 m || multiple || 1996–2021 || 09 Dec 2021 || 86 || align=left | Disc.: Spacewatch || 
|- id="1996 XS12" bgcolor=#d6d6d6
| 0 ||  || MBA-O || 15.7 || 4.0 km || multiple || 1996–2021 || 18 Jan 2021 || 189 || align=left | Disc.: Spacewatch || 
|- id="1996 XT12" bgcolor=#d6d6d6
| 0 ||  || MBA-O || 17.22 || 2.0 km || multiple || 1996–2021 || 08 Sep 2021 || 81 || align=left | Disc.: Spacewatch || 
|- id="1996 XZ12" bgcolor=#FFC2E0
| 9 ||  || ATE || 25.4 || data-sort-value="0.030" | 30 m || single || 3 days || 11 Dec 1996 || 12 || align=left | Disc.: Spacewatch || 
|- id="1996 XX14" bgcolor=#FFC2E0
| 3 ||  || APO || 19.2 || data-sort-value="0.51" | 510 m || multiple || 1996–2005 || 10 Feb 2005 || 65 || align=left | Disc.: Siding Spring || 
|- id="1996 XM17" bgcolor=#d6d6d6
| 0 ||  || MBA-O || 16.96 || 2.3 km || multiple || 1996–2021 || 06 Nov 2021 || 78 || align=left | Disc.: SpacewatchAdded on 30 September 2021 || 
|- id="1996 XO17" bgcolor=#d6d6d6
| 0 ||  || MBA-O || 16.2 || 3.2 km || multiple || 1996–2021 || 01 Jun 2021 || 108 || align=left | Disc.: SpacewatchAdded on 22 July 2020Alt.: 2010 BE74, 2010 NL55 || 
|- id="1996 XE18" bgcolor=#E9E9E9
| 0 ||  || MBA-M || 16.9 || 1.8 km || multiple || 1996–2020 || 25 Mar 2020 || 49 || align=left | Disc.: Spacewatch || 
|- id="1996 XX24" bgcolor=#E9E9E9
| 0 ||  || MBA-M || 16.50 || 2.8 km || multiple || 1996–2021 || 12 May 2021 || 230 || align=left | Disc.: SpacewatchAlt.: 2009 SV261, 2016 DM13, 2018 RW33 || 
|- id="1996 XN29" bgcolor=#d6d6d6
| 0 ||  || MBA-O || 16.84 || 2.4 km || multiple || 1996–2021 || 12 May 2021 || 53 || align=left | Disc.: SpacewatchAlt.: 2015 DV184 || 
|- id="1996 XM36" bgcolor=#E9E9E9
| 0 ||  || MBA-M || 18.48 || data-sort-value="0.85" | 850 m || multiple || 1996–2021 || 27 Nov 2021 || 107 || align=left | Disc.: Spacewatch || 
|- id="1996 XQ36" bgcolor=#d6d6d6
| 0 ||  || MBA-O || 17.21 || 2.0 km || multiple || 1996–2021 || 08 May 2021 || 94 || align=left | Disc.: SpacewatchAdded on 22 July 2020 || 
|- id="1996 XL37" bgcolor=#fefefe
| 0 ||  || MBA-I || 18.2 || data-sort-value="0.68" | 680 m || multiple || 1996–2020 || 03 Apr 2020 || 87 || align=left | Disc.: SpacewatchAlt.: 2016 BM60 || 
|- id="1996 XX37" bgcolor=#d6d6d6
| 0 ||  || MBA-O || 16.22 || 3.2 km || multiple || 1996–2021 || 08 Aug 2021 || 127 || align=left | Disc.: Spacewatch || 
|- id="1996 XZ37" bgcolor=#fefefe
| 0 ||  || MBA-I || 17.27 || 1.0 km || multiple || 1996–2021 || 09 Jul 2021 || 137 || align=left | Disc.: Xinglong Stn. || 
|- id="1996 XA38" bgcolor=#fefefe
| 0 ||  || MBA-I || 18.5 || data-sort-value="0.59" | 590 m || multiple || 1996–2020 || 16 Oct 2020 || 48 || align=left | Disc.: SpacewatchAdded on 17 January 2021 || 
|}
back to top

References 
 

Lists of unnumbered minor planets